Martin Maloney (born 1961) is a contemporary English artist.

Life and work
Martin Maloney was born in London. He attended the University of Sussex 1980–1983, Central Saint Martins College of Art and Design 1988–1991 and Goldsmiths College 1991–1992

Martin Maloney practises deliberately "bad" painting, where images (mainly figures) are achieved with apparently inept draughtsmanship and crude painting. Through his expressionistic style, strong colours, and humorous subject matter, Maloney's paintings record everyday experiences and moments of awkward intimacy. He often incorporates references to art history, from Vermeer to Georg Baselitz.

Art historian Julian Stallabrass said that Maloney's work was "childishly sweet and banal figure paintings".<ref>[http://books.guardian.co.uk/departments/artsandentertainment/story/0,6000,131199,00.html "Don't Talk Maloney", Adrian Searle, The Guardian, February 1, 2000] Retrieved April 11, 2006</ref> Maloney was an exhibitor Saatchi Collection on display as Sensation, held at the Royal Academy, London, in 1997. He was also exhibited in the New Neurotic Realism'' show held at the Saatchi Gallery.

Twenty artworks by Maloney were destroyed in the 2004 fire at the Momart storage warehouse.

Here are some examples of Martin's artwork: Stroller, Cul de Sac, Public Sculpture and Planters.

References

1961 births
Living people
20th-century English painters
21st-century English painters
Alumni of Goldsmiths, University of London
Alumni of the University of Sussex
Alumni of Central Saint Martins
Artists from London
English contemporary artists
English male painters
20th-century English male artists
21st-century English male artists